The 1966 Sun Bowl was a college football postseason bowl game between the Wyoming Cowboys and the Florida State Seminoles, played on December 24 at

Background
The Cowboys were champions of the Western Athletic Conference (WAC) for the first time and were in the Sun Bowl for the third time in ten years. Florida State was an independent and in the Sun Bowl for the first time in a dozen years.

Game summary
Wyoming junior halfback Jim Kiick rushed for 135 yards on 25 carries, caught four passes for 42 yards, and scored twice (first and third quarters).

Cowboy Jerry Marion caught a 39-yard pass from quarterback Rick Egloff to tie the score at fourteen each. Kiick's touchdown of 43 yards reclaimed the lead for Wyoming at  In the fourth quarter, Egloff added a rushing touchdown to make  Hammond and Ron Sellers connected for another touchdown reception to narrow the margin to eight, but the Seminoles failed to

Aftermath
The Cowboys have yet to return to the Sun Bowl. While Eaton won three consecutive conference titles (1966, 1967, and 1968), he was fired four years later. The Cowboys struggled in his last sixteen games: they went  in the final six games of the 1969 and through the 1970 season, after getting rid of 14 players for wanting to wear armbands in protest. The Seminoles have also not returned to the Sun Bowl since this game, but have had better success in the time since.

References

Sun Bowl
Sun Bowl
Florida State Seminoles football bowl games
Wyoming Cowboys football bowl games
Sun Bowl
December 1966 sports events in the United States